Gerhard Zandberg (born 23 April 1983) is a retired Olympic swimmer from South Africa. He swam for South Africa at:
Olympics: 2004, 2008
World Championships: 2003, 2007, 2009, 2011
Commonwealth Games: 2006, 2010
African Games: 2007, 2011
Short Course Worlds: 2008

At the 2008 Olympics, he set the African and South African records in the long course 100 Back (53.75). At the 2009 World Championships, he set the same two records in the 50 back (24.34).

See also
 List of Commonwealth Games medallists in swimming (men)

References

External links

1983 births
Living people
Sportspeople from Pretoria
White South African people
University of Pretoria alumni
South African male swimmers
Male backstroke swimmers
Swimmers at the 2004 Summer Olympics
Swimmers at the 2008 Summer Olympics
Olympic swimmers of South Africa
Swimmers at the 2002 Commonwealth Games
Swimmers at the 2006 Commonwealth Games
Commonwealth Games gold medallists for South Africa
Commonwealth Games bronze medallists for South Africa
World Aquatics Championships medalists in swimming
Medalists at the FINA World Swimming Championships (25 m)
Commonwealth Games medallists in swimming
African Games gold medalists for South Africa
African Games medalists in swimming
Competitors at the 2007 All-Africa Games
Medallists at the 2002 Commonwealth Games
Medallists at the 2006 Commonwealth Games